Gonidomus newtoni is an extinct species of air-breathing land snail, a terrestrial pulmonate gastropod mollusk in the family Streptaxidae.

This species was endemic to Mauritius. It is now extinct.

References

Streptaxidae
Extinct gastropods
Taxonomy articles created by Polbot
Endemic fauna of Mauritius